Miss Teen USA 1984, the 2nd Miss Teen USA pageant, was televised live from Memphis Cook Convention Center, Memphis, Tennessee on 3 April 1984.  At the conclusion of the final competition, Cherise Haugen of Illinois was crowned by outgoing queen Ruth Zakarian of New York.

Results

Placements

Special awards

Final competition scores
There was a technical error during the interview competition which resulted in only some contestants' scores being shown.

 Winner 
 First runner-up
 Second runner-up 
 Third runner-up
 Fourth runner-up

Historical significance 
 Illinois wins competition for the first time. Also becoming in the 2nd state who wins Miss Teen USA.
 Hawaii earns the 1st runner-up position for the first time. 
 Tennessee earns the 2nd runner-up position for the first time.
 Oregon earns the 3rd runner-up position for the first time.
 Texas earns the 4th runner-up position for the second time and repeats the same placement as the previous year. 
 The only state that placed in semifinals the previous year was Texas and made its second consecutive placement.
 Hawaii placed for the first time.
 Illinois placed for the first time.
 New Mexico placed for the first time.
 North Carolina placed for the first time.
 North Dakota placed for the first time.
 Oklahoma placed for the first time.
 Oregon placed for the first time.
 Tennessee placed for the first time.
 Wisconsin placed for the first time.

Delegates
The Miss Teen USA 1984 delegates were:

 Alabama - Teresa Chappell
 Alaska - Dawn Goldy
 Arizona - Shawn Anders
 Arkansas - Melissa Staples
 California - Jodie Alvarez
 Colorado - Timothy Ermouse
 Connecticut - Monique Savery
 Delaware - Heather Reed
 District of Columbia - Suzy Singstock
 Florida - Mai-Lis Kunholm
 Georgia - Andrea Randall
 Hawaii - Melea Yamamura
 Idaho - Laura Bates
 Illinois - Cherise Haugen
 Indiana - Chris Harrell
 Iowa - Kim Carlson
 Kansas - Nancy Mardis
 Kentucky - Susan McClarick
 Louisiana - Robin Swain
 Maine - Beth Maxwell
 Maryland - Christie Morris
 Massachusetts - Shauna Pemberton
 Michigan - Dawn Downing
 Minnesota - Heather Johnson
 Mississippi - Mona Bryant
 Missouri - Leanne Sizenstoker
 Montana - Pam Miller
 Nebraska - Cindy Frymiller
 Nevada - Raina Kirkland
 New Hampshire - Lisa Bernald
 New Jersey - Tracey Grinnen
 New Mexico - Cheryl Douds
 New York -  Denise Scalez
 North Carolina - Tracey Kaggel
 North Dakota - Kari Larson
 Ohio - Stephanie Viah
 Oklahoma - Jayme Brasher
 Oregon - Dena Woodard
 Pennsylvania - Robin Visk
 Rhode Island -  Jennifer Ammeroso
 South Carolina - Mary Delgado
 South Dakota - Kim Stromb
 Tennessee - Molly Brown
 Texas - Charlene Molinar
 Utah - Leslie Hunt
 Vermont - Darcy Hedrick
 Virginia - Marcy Brickhouse
 Washington - Charlene Walters
 West Virginia - Trina Vertillo
 Wisconsin-Adrianne Hazelwood 
 Wyoming - Allison Falk

Judges
Ana Alicia
Robert Lindgren
Judi Anderson
Michael Damian
Mary Clark
Michael Tylo
Marguerite Piazza
Jim Stuckey
Shaun Casey
Vincent DeFrank
Roxie Roker

Contestant notes
Adrianne Hazelwood (Wisconsin) became the first Miss Teen USA delegate to win a Miss USA state title, when she became Miss Connecticut USA 1985.  She competed at Miss USA 1985, but did not place.
Cherise Haugen competed in the Miss USA 1984 pageant, as Miss Teen USA 1984.  In the early years of the title, the Miss Teen USA titleholder was invited to compete at the following Miss USA pageant without holding a state title.  Haugen did not place at the Miss event.
Kari Larson (North Dakota) won the Miss North Dakota USA 1990 title and was a non-finalist at Miss USA 1990.  She later became the director of the Miss North Dakota USA and North Dakota Teen USA pageants.
Others who later competed at Miss USA were:
Molly Brown (Tennessee) - Miss Tennessee USA 1987, did not place
Melissa Staples (Arkansas) - Miss Arkansas USA 1988, did not place

References

1984
1984 in Tennessee
1984 beauty pageants